This article contains a list of people depicted on postage stamps issued by Latvia, along with the dates of issue.

 References External Links

A
Gunārs Astra - dissident, human rights activist (October 22, 2005)

B
Kārlis Baumanis - composer (May 21, 2005)
Jānis Balodis - general, Commander of the Aizsargi units (May 12, 1932; November 18, 1938)

Č
Jānis Čakste - first president of the Republic of Latvia (December 4, 1930; August 19, 1931; April 18, 1928; November 11, 1998)
Elīza Cauce (née Tīruma) - luger (July 3, 2014)

D
Kristiāns Johans Dāls - director of naval schools of Ainaži and Liepāja (July 20, 2002)
Leonardo da Vinci - Italian polymath (December 7, 1932)
Daumants Dreiškens - bobsledder (July 3, 2014)
Martins Dukurs - skeleton sledder (July 3, 2014)

F
Hieronīms Kārlis Fridrihs Fon Minhauzens - baron and author (April 1, 2005)

J
Inese Jaunzeme - athlete (June 19, 1996)
Jānis Pāvils II - Roman Catholic Pope (August 28, 1993; August 14, 2005)

K
Oskars Kalpaks - first Commander in Chief of Latvian Armed Forces (January 6, 2007)
Jēkabs Ketlers - Duke of the Duchy of Courland and Semigallia (November 14, 2001)
Miķelis Krogzems - (January 4, 1936)
Atis Kronvalds - (January 4, 1936)
Dainis Kūla - athlete (June 19, 1996)
Alberts Kviesis - third president of the Republic of Latvia (December 4, 1930; August 19, 1931; November 11, 2000)

L
Jānis Lūsis - athlete (June 19, 1996)

M
Juris Māters - (January 4, 1936)
Zenta Mauriņa - writer (May 10, 1996; January 7, 2006 (stamp on stamp))
Zigfrīds Anna Meierovics - politician, first minister of foreign affairs (August 20, 1929)
Oskars Melbārdis - bobsledder (July 3, 2014)

O
Elvīra Ozoliņa - athlete (June 19, 1996)

P
Andrejs Pumpurs - poet (January 4, 1936)

R
Jānis Rainis - poet, playwright, translator, politician and author (May 22, 1930)
Mārtiņš Rubenis - luger (July 3, 2014)

S
Andris Šics - luger (July 3, 2014)
Juris Šics - luger (July 3, 2014)
Pauls Stradiņš - physician (January 13, 1996)
Jānis Strenga - bobsledder (July 3, 2014)

T
Mihails Tāls - chess player (August 18, 2001)

U
Kārlis Ulmanis - fourth president of the Republic of Latvia (September 4, 1937; November 18, 1938; May 13, 1939; February 7, 2001)

V
Julijans Vaivods - Roman Catholic cardinal (August 18, 1995)
Krišjānis Valdemārs - (November 14, 2001)
Ēvalds Valters - actor (April 2, 1994)
Arvis Vilkaste - bobsledder (July 3, 2014)

Z
Gustavs Zemgals - second president of the Republic of Latvia (December 4, 1930; August 19, 1931; November 16, 1999)

References

External links
Latvian Post

Latvia
Stamps
Stamps
Stamps